Urazayevo (Urazay) is a rural locality (a village) in Staroyanbayevsky Selsoviet, Baltachevsky District, Bashkortostan, Russia. The population was 420 as of 2010. There are 8 streets.

Geography 
Urazayevo is located 18 km southeast of Starobaltachevo (the district's administrative centre) by road. Staroyanbayevo is the nearest rural locality.

References 

Rural localities in Baltachevsky District